Leiothorax is an extinct genus of shrimp in the order Decapoda. It contains the species Leiothorax triasicus.

References

Caridea
Triassic crustaceans